Mushroom Networks, Inc. is a telecommunications company in San Diego, California.

Mushroom Networks was founded in 2004, by electrical and computer engineers Rene L. Cruz, Cahit Akin, and Rajesh Mishra. It was spun off from the University of California, San Diego (UCSD) and got support from the von Liebig Center. Mushroom Networks also received initial funding and support from ITU Ventures, a Los Angeles investment firm.

The company solely focuses on networking products utilizing their "Broadband Bonding" technology. In various configurations, these products provide the end-user with the appearance of larger bandwidth by aggregating multiple network services through load balancing, and/or channel bonding.

History 
 In February, 2008, Mushroom Networks announced the Truffle (BBNA6401) as a new broadband bonding network appliance. The Truffle (BBNA6401) can bond up to six high speed internet connections to improve the network speed.
 In July, 2008, the company introduced another product the Porcini (BBNA4422) as a smaller broadband bonding product. This product can bond up to four high speed internet connections and a wireless USB port card to improve internet speeds.
 In September, 2008 the company introduced the PortaBella (BBNA2242) combining multiple cellular data cards into one single internet protocol connection. This product allows for bandwidth in which wired connectivity is not an option.
 In June, 2009, Mushroom Networks announced the second generation PortaBella (BBNA141)  the fastest wireless cellular internet connection. This small portable product has room for four wireless modems on the front side, with an ethernet port in the back.
 In July, 2009, the company announced the second generation of Truffle (BBNA6401), calling it the Truffle(BBNA5201G). The second generation has higher throughput, enhanced quality of service (QoS), and automatic failover as well as some other enterprise level features.
 In April, 2010, Mushroom Networks announces the Teleporter, the industry's first broadcast quality live video streaming system utilizing bonded cellular link devices. The Teleporter enables a single broadcast journalist to send high quality digital video over wireless local cellular networks instead of requiring a large broadcast crew with more expensive equipment.
 In July 2017, Mushroom Networks launched autopilot' SD-WAN service for partners.
In August 2019, Mushroom Networks was awarded the TMC 2019 Communications Solutions Product of the Year award for its Cognitive SD-WAN product line.

References 

Telecommunications companies established in 2004
Companies based in San Diego
Networking companies of the United States
Networking hardware companies
Networking software companies
Computer security software companies
Telecommunications equipment vendors
Privately held companies based in California
Service-oriented (business computing)